Rabbinate may refer to:

 Most often, the office or function of a rabbi
 Chief Rabbinate of Israel, the supreme Jewish religious governing body in the state of Israel
 Military Rabbinate, an Israel Defense Forces unit that provides religious services to soldiers, including non-Jews

See also 
 Rabbinic Judaism
 Sanhedrin